Allergen of the Year is an annual award voted upon by the American Contact Dermatitis Society. This is "designed to draw attention to allergens that are very common, under-recognized, merit more attention because they are causing significant allergic contact dermatitis or are no longer causing significant relevant disease (as in thimerosal)".

Awards 
2023 - Lanolin
2022 – Aluminum
2021 – Acetophenone azine
2020 – Isobornyl acrylate 
2019 – Parabens (Non) Allergen
2018 – Propylene Glycol
2017 – Alkyl Glucoside
2016 – Cobalt
2015 – Formaldehyde
2014 – Benzophenones
 2013 – Methylisothiazolinone - This chemical is used as a preservative in many cosmetics, lotions, and makeup removers; some of its side effects include flaky or scaly skin, breakouts, redness or itchiness, and moderate to severe swelling in the eye area.
 2012 – Acrylate
 2011 – Dimethyl fumarate - Dimethyl fumarate is the chemical associated with 'poisoned chairs' and 'toxic sandals'.
 2010 – Neomycin (antibiotic)
 2009 – Mixed dialkyl thiourea - Neoprene rubber is a common source.
 2008 – Nickel
 2007 – Fragrance
 2006 – p-Phenylenediamine - PPD is the hair dye chemical that is used to augment black henna tattoos. It has been shown to cause severe blistering and scarring, and its topical use is banned in some countries.
 2005 – Corticosteroids
 2004 – Cocamidopropyl betaine
 2003 – Bacitracin
 2002 – Thimerosal 
 2001 – Gold
 2000 – Disperse Blue Dyes

See also 
 List of cutaneous conditions

References

External links
 ACDS Allergens of the Year
 Review ACDS’ Allergen of the Year 2000-2015, by The Dermatologist.

Allergology